Porter Wayne and Dolly Rebecca is the fourth collaborative studio album by Porter Wagoner and Dolly Parton. It was released on March 9, 1970, by RCA Victor. The album was produced by Bob Ferguson. It peaked at number four on the Billboard Top Country Albums chart and number 137 on the Billboard 200 chart. Two top ten singles were released from the album, "Just Someone I Used to Know" and "Tomorrow Is Forever", peaking at numbers five and nine, respectively. "Just Someone I Used to Know" was nominated for Best Country Performance by a Duo or Group at the 12th Annual Grammy Awards.

Recording
Recording sessions for the album took place at RCA Studio B in Nashville, Tennessee, on December 1, 2 and 3, 1969. Two songs on the album were recorded during sessions for 1969's Always, Always. "Just Someone I Used to Know" and "Mendy Never Sleeps" were recorded on April 21 and 22, 1969, respectively.

Release and promotion
The album was released March 9, 1970, on LP, 8-track, and cassette.

Singles
The album's first single, "Just Someone I Used to Know", was released in September 1969 and debuted at number 62 on the Billboard Hot Country Songs chart dated October 25. It peaked at number five on the chart dated December 13, its eighth week on the chart. The single charted for a total of 16 weeks. It also peaked at number 20 in Canada on the RPM Country Singles chart. "Tomorrow Is Forever" was released as the second single in January 1970, and debuted at number 75 on the Billboard Hot Country Songs chart dated February 14. It peaked at number nine on the chart dated April 4, its eighth week on the chart. It charted for 15 weeks. It also peaked at number 34 in Canada on the RPM Country Singles chart.

Critical reception

In the issue dated March 21, 1970, Billboard published a review which said, "This great country duo does "Tomorrow Is Forever", their current smash single, in addition to "Forty Miles from Poplar Bluff", "Silver Sandals", and others. It is a powerful package, full of true country flavor."

Cashbox published a review in the March 14, 1970 issue, saying, "Porter Wagoner and Dolly Parton join forces once again and perform an album that’s certain to be a smash. The two singers blend their talents on a cluster of good tunes, a number of them the work of Dolly herself (one of these, "Tomorrow Is Forever", is a current single hit for Porter and Dolly). Reserve a spot on the charts for this one."

AllMusic gave the album 4.5 out of 5 stars.

Commercial performance
The album debuted at number 39 on the Billboard Top Country Albums chart dated March 28, 1970. It peaked at number four on the chart dated June 13, its twelfth week on the chart. The album charted for 25 weeks. It also peaked at number 137 on the Billboard 200 chart.

Accolades
The album's first single, "Just Someone I Used to Know", earned a nomination for Best Country Performance by a Duo or Group at the 12th Annual Grammy Awards. It was Wagoner's eighth nomination and Parton's first.

Reissues
The album was included in the 2014 box set Just Between You and Me: The Complete Recordings, 1967–1976, marking the first time it had been reissued since its original release. It was released as a digital download on September 28, 2018. BGO Records reissued the album on CD in 2020 on a two CD set with Just Between You and Me, Always, Always, and Love and Music.

Track listing

Personnel
Adapted form the album liner notes and RCA recording session records.

Joseph Babcock – background vocals
Glenn Baxter – trumpet
Jerry Carrigan – drums
Anita Carter – background vocals
Danny Davis – trumpets
Pete Drake – steel
Bobby Dyson – bass
Dolores Edgin – background vocals
Bob Ferguson – producer, liner notes
Lloyd Green – steel
Roy M. Huskey, Jr. – bass
Les Leverett – cover photograph
Mack Magaha – fiddle
George McCormick – rhythm guitar
Bill McElhiney – trumpets
Wayne Moss – guitar
Al Pachucki – recording engineer
June Evelyn Page – background vocals
Dolly Parton – lead vocals
Hargus Robbins – piano
Dale Sellers – guitar
Roy Shockley – recording technician
Jerry Stembridge – electric guitar
Buck Trent – banjo
Porter Wagoner – lead vocals
Hurshel Wiginton  – background vocals

Charts

Release history

References

Dolly Parton albums
Porter Wagoner albums
1970 albums
Albums produced by Bob Ferguson (music)
Vocal duet albums
RCA Records albums